Glassdoor is an American website where current and former employees anonymously review companies. Headquartered in San Francisco, California, it has additional offices in Chicago, Dublin, London, and São Paulo. Glassdoor also allows its users to anonymously submit and view salaries as well as search and apply for jobs on its platform.

In 2018, the company was acquired by the Japanese multinational Recruit Holdings for US$1.2 billion, and it continues to operate as an independent subsidiary.

Founding
The company was cofounded in 2007 by Tim Besse, Robert Hohman (who serves as the company's CEO), and Expedia founder Rich Barton, who served as the company's chairman. As revealed in an 2014 article in the New York Times, the idea came from a brainstorming session between Barton and Hohman, when Barton relayed the story of accidentally leaving the results of an employee survey on the printer while working at Expedia, when the two began to think about what would have happened if the results had gotten out into the public. The two hypothesized that if the material had been revealed publicly, it could have been a service to those looking to make career decisions. The company's headquarters were established in Mill Valley, California.

Website
Glassdoor launched its company ratings site in June 2008, as a site that "collects company reviews and real salaries from employees of large companies and displays them anonymously for all members to see", according to TechCrunch. The company then averaged the reported salaries, posting these averages alongside the reviews employees made of the management and culture of the companies they worked for – including some of the larger tech companies like Google and Yahoo. The site also allows the posting of office photographs and other company-relevant media.

The site later also began focusing on CEOs and workplaces and what it is like to work at jobs in general. Employee reviews are averaged for each company. Glassdoor ratings are based on user-generated reviews. Each year Glassdoor ranks overall company ratings to determine its annual Employees’ Choice Awards, also known as the Best Places to Work Awards. The website verifies that each review of a company comes from real employees "through technological checks of e-mail addresses and through screenings by a content management team", according to Glassdoor spokesman Scott Dobroski. The company has stated that it rejects about 20% of entries after screening. Rules for posting reviews are different for smaller companies than they are for larger companies in order to preserve the anonymity of people in close departments.

In 2010, Glassdoor released a fee-based program called "Enhanced Employer Profiles", which allows employers to include their own content on Glassdoor profiles, like executive biographies, classifieds, social media links, and referrals. The company also allows users to post potential job interview questions that might be asked by certain companies, acquired by interviewed job candidates, in addition to other information that can be used to prepare job applications. The reputation a company has on Glassdoor has also been found correlative by Case Western Professor Casey Newmeyer. It has also been used to vet potential client companies.

In 2014, the company hired Adam Spiegel as its CFO, with the intention of preparing for an eventual IPO. By 2015, the site had 30 million users from 190 countries and corporate clients including one third of all Fortune 500 companies. That year, Glassdoor also began creating localized websites and mobile apps for different national jurisdictions, such as Germany.

In September 2016, Glassdoor acquired Brazil's Love Mondays to expand into Latin America.

The company's own site stats updated Q1 2017 show 41 million unique users and 5,800 paying employer clients or partners. The statistics showed that the average company rating is 3.3, on a 5-point scale where 1.0 is very dissatisfied; 72% of employees rate their job/company "OK" and average CEO approval rating is 67%.

In 2017, Glassdoor announced on its website that it would no longer post job advertisements that exclude people with criminal records.

In November 2017, the U.S. Court of Appeals required disclosing Glassdoor's anonymous users' identities to prosecutors investigating possible criminal misconduct by their employers. Investigators sought to speak with reviewers who might have seen crimes committed. The court's decision did not require sharing reviewers' identities with employers.

In February 2019, Glassdoor announced that COO Christian Sutherland-Wong would be promoted to President & COO.

In May 2020, Glassdoor announced it was laying off 300 people. The cut accounted for 30% of the company's workforce and half of the Chicago office. In an internal memo, CEO Christian Sutherland-Wong cited an overall decrease in hiring and recruiting across multiple industries due to the COVID-19 pandemic.

Reports
Glassdoor produces reports based upon the data collected from its users, on topics including work–life balance, CEO pay-ratios, lists of the best office places and cultures, and the accuracy of corporate job searching maxims. Data from Glassdoor has also been used by outside sources to produce estimates on the effects of salary trends and changes on corporate revenues. Glassdoor also puts the conclusions of its research of other companies towards its own company policies. In 2015, Tom Lakin produced the first study of Glassdoor in the United Kingdom, concluding that Glassdoor is regarded by users as a more trustworthy source of information than career guides or official company documents.

Financing
The company received its first financing in 2008, receiving $3 million in funding, before launching its website. In 2012 Glassdoor received $20 million of venture capital, taking its total outside funding to $42.2 million. The following year, the company raised an additional $50 million. In 2015 the company raised an additional $70 million, in an investment round led by Google Capital, giving the company a valuation of just short of $1 billion. The total of investment at this point was $160 million. In 2016 Glassdoor raised an additional $40 million from investors. In May 2018, Recruit Holdings announced its intention to acquire Glassdoor for $1.2 billion in cash, with the acquisition completed in June 2018.

Awards
In April 2013, Glassdoor won a Red Herring North America Award for Social Media Innovation.

Controversy
As of December 2022 Glassdoor has a 1.2/5 "Bad" rating on Trustpilot, the integrity of Glassdoor's business concept being questioned by many of the reviewers.  In June 2022 Glassdoor lost a defamation lawsuit, forcing it to unmask the identity of users of the Glassdoor website who anonymously left negative reviews about their former employer.

References

External links
 

Recruit (company)
Business services companies established in 2007
Employment websites in the United States
Companies based in Marin County, California
Mill Valley, California
Internet properties established in 2008
2008 establishments in California
American review websites
2018 mergers and acquisitions
American subsidiaries of foreign companies 
Professional networks